Courts of Kansas include:
;State courts of Kansas
Kansas Supreme Court
Kansas Court of Appeals
Kansas District Courts (31 districts)
Kansas Municipal Courts

Federal courts located in Kansas
United States District Court for the District of Kansas

References

External links
National Center for State Courts – directory of state court websites.

Courts in the United States